Just above the sternum the two anterior jugular veins communicate by a transverse trunk, the jugular venous arch (or venous jugular arch), which receive tributaries from the inferior thyroid veins; each also communicates with the internal jugular.

There are no valves in this vein.

References 

Veins of the head and neck